Thayai Katha Thanayan is a 1962 Indian Tamil-language film, directed by M. A. Thirumugam and produced by Sandow M. M. A. Chinnappa Thevar. The film stars M. G. Ramachandran, M. R. Radha and B. Saroja Devi. It was released on 13 April 1962.

Plot 

Shekar is from an affluent family and Maragadham is from a poor family. Maragadham's brother Kandhan is a tea-stall owner who hates rich people because of some unpleasant incident from his past. A local goon Muthaiah loves Maragadham and wants to marry her. Neither Maragadham nor Kandhan like Muthaiah. Shekar once saves Maragadham from Muthaiah, after which Maragadham gets a chance to save Shekar's life when during one of his hunting adventures, a tiger attacks him. Both develop a liking towards each other. However, Kandhan's hatred towards the rich comes in the way of their love. Will the two lovers be able to unite or will Kandhan's hatred and Muthaiah's evil intentions win?

Cast 
 M. G. Ramachandran as Shekar
 M. R. Radha as Kandhan and Rathinam
 B. Saroja Devi as Maragadham
 P. Kannamba as Shekar's mother
 S. A. Ashokan as Muthaiah
 Sandow M. M. A. Chinnappa Thevar as Mayandi
G. Sakunthala as Bakkiyam
 M. R. R. Vasu as Sadhasivam

Soundtrack 
The music was composed by K. V. Mahadevan.

Reception 
Kanthan of Kalki criticised the film for lacking newness, and having a Thai Sollai Thattathe hangover, given the near same cast and crew.

References

External links 

1960s Tamil-language films
1962 films
Films directed by M. A. Thirumugam
Films scored by K. V. Mahadevan